John Middleton Lankester Paul (20 April 1921 – 23 February 1995) was a British actor.

He is best known for his television roles, particularly as Dr Spencer Quist in Doomwatch (1970–1972) and Marcus Agrippa in I, Claudius (1976), both for BBC Television.

An early role was as the lead in the ITV series Probation Officer in the early 1960s. He appeared as Captain Flint in a BBC adaptation of Arthur Ransome's Swallows and Amazons in 1963. He had guest roles in episodes of popular television series such as Out of the Unknown, Doctor Finlay's Casebook, The Avengers, Dixon of Dock Green, The Saint, Marked Personal and The New Avengers, mostly during the 1960s and 1970s. One of his final TV appearances was in Selling Hitler, based on the real-life attempts to sell fake diaries attributed to Adolf Hitler.

During his career he also appeared in feature films such as Yangtse Incident (1957), The Curse of the Mummy's Tomb (1964), Cromwell (1970), Eye of the Needle (1981), and Cry Freedom (1987).

Partial filmography

 The Long Arm (1956) - Police Radio Operator (uncredited)
 The Girl in the Picture (1957) - Det. Sgt. Nixon
 Yangtse Incident: The Story of H.M.S. Amethyst (1957) - Staff Officer Operations
 The Steel Bayonet (1957) - Lt. Col. Derry
 The Flesh Is Weak (1957) - Sergeant Franks
 Time Lock (1957) - Foreman (uncredited)
 The Man Who Wouldn't Talk (1958) - John Castle
 Law and Disorder (1958) - Customs Officer
 Violent Moment (1959) - Sgt. Ranson
 Breakout (1959) - Arkwright
 Deadly Record (1959) - Phil Gamage
 Swallows and Amazons (1963) - Captain Flint
 Take Me Over (1963) - Campbell Carter
 The Beauty Jungle (1964) - Advertising Agent (uncredited)
 The Curse of the Mummy's Tomb (1964) - Inspector Mackenzie
 A Countess from Hong Kong (1967) - The Captain
 The Blood Beast Terror (1968) - Mr. Warrender
 The Strange Affair (1968) - Pub Group
 Some Girls Do (1969) - Test Pilot (uncredited)
 The Desperados (1969) - Sheriff Lacey
 Cromwell (1970) - General Digby
 Doomwatch (1972) - Dr. Spencer Quist
 The Bunker (1981) - Gen. Wilhelm Keitel
 Eye of the Needle (1981) - Home Guard Captain
 Cry Freedom (1987) - Wendy's stepfather

References

External links

1921 births
1995 deaths
English male television actors
English male film actors
20th-century English male actors